International University of Business Agriculture and Technology (IUBAT) is the first non-government university in Bangladesh. It was established in 1991 under the Private University Act (PUA) of 1992 (now replaced by PUA 2010) by M Alimullah Miyan. IUBAT is a full member of Association of Commonwealth Universities, London and this extended formal recognition of IUBAT degrees in 35 countries or regions of the Commonwealth.

References

Universities of Uttara
Private universities in Bangladesh
Universities and colleges in Dhaka
Agricultural universities and colleges in Bangladesh
Educational institutions established in 1991
1991 establishments in Bangladesh